Badiera is a genus of flowering plants belonging to the family Polygalaceae.

Its native range is Caribbean.

Species:

Badiera cubensis 
Badiera fuertesii 
Badiera oblongata 
Badiera penaea 
Badiera propinqua 
Badiera subrhombifolia 
Badiera virgata

References

Polygalaceae
Fabales genera